Kyle Harris (born May 20, 1986) is an American actor, singer, and dancer. He has performed on Broadway and in television, and is best known for his role as Cameron Goodkin on the Freeform (formerly ABC Family) television series Stitchers.

Life and career 
Harris was born in Newport Beach, California. He attend Woodbridge High School in Irvine. He then attended the University of Arizona, obtaining a BFA in Musical Theatre.

Filmography

Theater

Awards and nominations

References

External links 
 
 

1986 births
Living people
21st-century American male actors
American male musical theatre actors
American male television actors
Male actors from California
People from Newport Beach, California